Chi Zhongrui or Chi Chongrui (born 23 December 1952) is a Chinese actor famous for his role as Tang Sanzang in the 1986 television series Journey to the West.

Biography

Early life
Chi was born in a family of Peking opera actors, on December 23, 1952. During the Down to the Countryside Movement, he became a sent-down youth and worked in Heilongjiang Production and Construction Corps, then he became a soldier and serving in Yunan. He entered China Broadcasting Art Troupe while he leaving the Army, two years later, he was accepted to Shanghai Theater Academy. After graduation, he was assigned to China Television Production Center (CTPC) as an actor.

Acting career
In 1981, he had his first experience in front of the camera , and he was chosen to act as a support actor in Doulao Kouhua Kai.
In 1982, he made his film debut in Bizhongqing, playing Huanshu.
In 1983, he appeared in Golden Late Autumn and This Is Not A Mistake.
In 1984, he rose to fame after portraying Tang Sanzang in the shenmo television series Journey to the West, adapted from Wu Cheng'en's classical novel of the same title. That same year, he also participated in the spy thriller television series Harbin Enveloped in Darkness.
In 2005, he starred as Jianzhen in the historical television series Journey to the West.
In 2010, he starred opposite Liu Xiao Ling Tong, Ma Dehua, Liu Dagang in Wu Cheng'en and Journey to the West.
In 2015, he was cast in the lead role of Tang Sanzang in the Paramount Pictures's production Journey to the West 3D, a 3D Chinese-American action fantasy film adaptation based on the novel of the same name by Wu Cheng'en.

Personal life
In 1990 Chi married Chen Lihua, one of China's richest women.

Works

Television

Film

References

1952 births
Male actors from Beijing
Living people
Shanghai Theatre Academy alumni
Chinese male television actors